Science Will Figure You Out is the first official release by Soltero, aka Tim Howard. It was recorded with Ben Sterling and the Mobius Band in Amherst, MA. It was released in the Summer of 2001.

Track listing
 Memorial Drive
 Laundrydaydreams
 Bottomfeeder
 Communist Love Song
 The Priest
 I Am Sitting in a Room
 7 Wonders
 Poughkeepsie's Always Proud
 The Missionary
 Kentuckyland
 Slow Bomb
 St. Martin Says 'Hi'

References

2001 debut albums
Soltero albums